Charlie Dupont (born 23 May 1971) is a Belgian actor who has appeared in film, television and theatre.

Charlie Dupont was born in Tournai, Belgium. His acting credits include Hard (2008), Largo Winch II (2011), Let My People Go! (2011), Métal Hurlant Chronicles (2012), Les Petits Meurtres d'Agatha Christie (2013), and Le Dernier Diamant (2014). On November 18, 2014, it was announced that Dupont would host the 5th Magritte Awards.

Personal life 
He has been married to actress Tania Garbarski since 2001. They have two children.

Filmography

Theater

References

External links
 

1971 births
Belgian male film actors
Belgian male stage actors
Belgian male television actors
Belgian screenwriters
Belgian film directors
Living people
People from Tournai